Yu Chun-an (born 11 August 1998), also known as Kevin Yu, is a professional golfer from Taiwan.

Amateur career
Yu has represented his country at multiple international competitions. He took the gold medal at the 2013 Asian Youth Games and won individual bronze and team gold at the 2014 Asian Games. He competed at the 2014 Summer Youth Olympics. He also competed at the 2017 Summer Universiade, winning bronze medals in the individual and team events. At the 2018 Asian Games, he finished fourth in the individual competition and fifth in the team competition. He has also competed at the Nomura Cup (2013, 2015), Eisenhower Trophy (2014, 2016), Bonallack Trophy (2016) and Arnold Palmer Cup (2019).

Yu played golf for Arizona State University from January 2017, winning three individual collegiate titles and finishing third, behind Matthew Wolff, in the individual competition at the 2019 NCAA Division I Men's Golf Championship. He won the Australian Master of the Amateurs in early 2019. He qualified for the 2020 U.S. Open, his third consecutive qualification in the event.

Professional career
Yu turned professional in 2021. He earned status on the Korn Ferry Tour for 2021 through the PGA Tour University program. He has two top-10 finishes in his first four starts.

Amateur wins
2013 Asian Youth Games (boy's individual), Taiwan National Fall Ranking Tournament, National Middle School - Senior
2014 Neighbors Trophy Team Championship, National Summer Ranking - Sixth Selection Tournament, Aaron Baddeley International Junior Championship - China, Yeangder Amateur Classic Leg 5
2015 Western Junior, Junior Players Championship
2017 National Invitational Tournament
2018 Bandon Dunes Championship
2019 Australian Master of the Amateurs, ASU Thunderbird Invitational

Source:

Playoff record
Korn Ferry Tour playoff record (0–1)

Results in major championships
Results not in chronological order before 2019 and in 2020.

CUT = missed the halfway cut
NT = No tournament due to COVID-19 pandemic

Results in The Players Championship

Team appearances
Nomura Cup (representing Chinese Taipei): 2013, 2015
Eisenhower Trophy (representing Chinese Taipei): 2014, 2016
Bonallack Trophy (representing Asia/Pacific team): 2016
Arnold Palmer Cup (representing International team): 2019 (winners)

Source:

See also
2022 Korn Ferry Tour Finals graduates

References

External links

Taiwanese male golfers
PGA Tour golfers
Arizona State Sun Devils men's golfers
Korn Ferry Tour graduates
Asian Games gold medalists for Chinese Taipei
Asian Games bronze medalists for Chinese Taipei
Asian Games medalists in golf
Golfers at the 2014 Asian Games
Golfers at the 2018 Asian Games
Medalists at the 2014 Asian Games
Golfers at the 2014 Summer Youth Olympics
Medalists at the 2017 Summer Universiade
1998 births
Living people